The Golfinho gas field is a natural gas field located offshore of the Cabo Delgado Province. It was discovered in 2012 and developed by Anadarko Petroleum. It began production in 2012 and produces natural gas and condensates. The total proven reserves of the Golfinho gas field are around 20 trillion cubic feet (571 km³), and production is slated to be around 200 million cubic feet/day (5.8×105m³).

References

Natural gas fields in Mozambique